Until We're Dead is the debut studio album by ska-punk/anarcho-punk band Star Fucking Hipsters. It was released in 2008 on Fat Wreck Chords.

Background
Leftöver Crack vocalist Stza and drummer Brandon Chevalier-Kolling were the original creators of the punk rock supergroup Star Fucking Hipsters. The band went on hiatus following Brandon’s untimely death. Stza eventually reunited with another former Leftöver Crack member, drummer Ara Babajian, along with friend Frank Piegaro of The Degenerics to reform the group. With the addition of female vocalist Nico de Gaillo of Another Dying Democracy and bassist Yula Beeri of World Inferno Friendship Society they crafted their full-length album in early 2008. According to Stza, the album was to be originally titled "Allergic To People". The album was recorded and mixed by Ryan Jones at The Wild Arctic in Queens, NY and additionally mixed by Stza and Jamie McMann at Motor Studios in San Francisco, California during the early half of June that year. It was eventually released by independent record label Fat Wreck Chords on September 30, 2008.

Singles
The album has spawned a video for the song "Two Cups of Tea".

Track listing

"Death or Fight" includes a reprised segment of "Immigrants & Hypocrites" after the end of the main song.

Personnel
Nico de Gaillo- vocals
Sturgeon F. Hipster- guitar, vocals
Frank Piegaro, guitar
Yula Beeri, bass
Ara Babajian, drums

Additional musicians
Franz Nicolay- piano, organ, accordion
Cara Wick- violins
Darius Koski- piano, accordion
Chad Mo- clarinets
Joey Cape- vocals

Production
Ryan Jones- mixing
Alan Douches- mastering
Fat Mike- production
Stza- production

References

2008 debut albums
Star Fucking Hipsters albums
Fat Wreck Chords albums